City of Portland may refer to:

 City of Portland (train) - a passenger train that used to run between Chicago and Portland Oregon
 City of Portland (Victoria), a former local government district in Australia
 City of Portland IV - the fourth of a series of fireboats operated by the City of Portland, Maine

See also 
 Portland (disambiguation)